Cherra Companyganj State Railways (CCSR) was a narrow gauge mountain railway that existed in British India.

History

The Cherra Companyganj State Railway was conceptualized by Hubert Kench, the British Executive Engineer of Khasi and Jaintia Hills Division, as there was need to connect Shillong, capital of province to Calcutta, then the capital of British India by rail. The CCSR in Meghalaya was opened to traffic on 6 June 1886. Seven gradients were worked by rope mechanisms. It was built at a cost of eight lakhs, which was incurred by erstwhile Provincial Government of Assam. An extension of railway link up to Sylhet and Goalundo was in plan from where railway link to Calcutta already existed but plans never materialised.

Closure

The railway continued to run between Tharia and Companyganj until the Assam earthquake of 1897 in which the tracks were completely destroyed. The tracks were not repaired after that and the railway finally closed in 1900.

References

2 ft 6 in gauge railways in India
Defunct railway companies of India
Rail transport in Meghalaya
Transport in Shillong
Transport in Sylhet